Elena Sofia Barucchieri (born 29 March 1962), known by the stage name Elena Sofia Ricci, is an Italian actress. She is known, among other things, for playing Sister Angela in the Italian television series .

Biography 
Born in Florence, after a few minor roles Ricci emerged in 1984, with the Pupi Avati's film Impiegati, for which she won a Globo d'oro for Best New Actress.

In 1988 she won a David di Donatello for Best Supporting Actress and a Silver Ribbon in the same category for her role in Carlo Verdone's Io e mia sorella.

In 1990 Ricci was awarded with a David di Donatello for Best Actress and a Ciak D'Oro in the same category for her performance in Ne parliamo Lunedì.

In 2010 she shared with Lunetta Savino a Silver Ribbon for Best supporting Actress for Mine vaganti, directed by Ferzan Özpetek.

Elena Sofia Ricci is very active as a television actress, starring in many popular TV series. For her television activity she received several awards, including two Telegatti, the 2005 Fiore di Roccia, and the 2006 Premio Afrodite as Best TV-Actress.

In 2018, she won the Silver Ribbon for Best Actress for her role of Veronica Lario in Paolo Sorrentino's Loro, for which she won the David di Donatello for Best Actress the following year.

Private life 
She is married to the musician Stefano Mainetti. Her second baby, Maria, was born in 2004. She was previously married to Luca Damiani and was also in a relationship with Pino Quartullo, with whom she had a daughter with. Formerly an agnostic, she now considers herself Roman Catholic.

Filmography

Awards 

 1988: David di Donatello for Best Supporting Actress for Io e mia sorella
 1988: Nastro d'Argento for Best Supporting Actress for Io e mia sorella
 1988: Ciak d'oro for Best Supporting Actress for Io e mia sorella
 1990: David di Donatello for Best Actress for Ne parliamo Lunedì
 1990: Ciak d'oro for Best Actress for Ne parliamo Lunedì
 2010: Nastro d'Argento for Best Supporting Actress for Loose Cannons
 2010: Ciak d'oro for Best Supporting Actress for Loose Cannons
 2018: Nastro d'Argento for Best Actress for Loro
 2019: David di Donatello for Best Actress for Loro

References

External links 

 
 

1962 births
Living people
Italian film actresses
Actors from Florence
David di Donatello winners
Nastro d'Argento winners
Ciak d'oro winners
Italian television actresses
20th-century Italian actresses
21st-century Italian actresses
Italian Roman Catholics
Converts to Catholicism from atheism or agnosticism